Sybarite Jewellery is a British luxury jewellery brand founded in London in 2012 by Margarita and Alyona Prykhodko.

The company is best known for kinetic jewellery, often featuring moving and mechanical elements combined with traditional jewellery-making techniques. To create the designs, Sybarite uses gemstones combined with Gold and Platinum. Margarita Prykhodko (formerly Prysiazhniuk) personally develops the designs.

Founding 
In 2012 Sybarite Jewellery was founded when Margarita Prykhdko designed the first mechanic Dancing Rings with movements, the Dancing Doll Ring. Using her training as an architect and engineer, Margarita combined Haute jewellery techniques with Kinetic art. Sybarite pieces were recognised by publications such as Tatler and Harpers Bazaar.

Recent History 
In 2016, Sybarite Jewellery presented their 'Waltz of The Flowers', 'Ballerina and the Tin Soldier’ collections at Baselworld in Switzerland.

Sybarite hosts private events for VIP guests at venues including the Serpentine Gallery, The Orangery at Kensington Palace and The Arts Club. Sybarite has also been showcased within Promenade Porto Cervo.

In 2021, Sybarite Jewellery's founder and designer Margarita Pryhkodko was invited to take part in the jury panel of the ‘Jewellery Masterpiece Awards’, which honours excellence and artistry in the jewellery world.

In 2022, Margarita joined the Tvorchestvo Society of Painters, in Odessa. Margarita's paintings were included as part of the National Union of Artists of Ukraine.

Collections 
Sybarite offers a selection of one-of-a-kind pieces focusing on movement and intricate kinetic mechanisms, which were first implemented in the spinning rings, known as the Dancing Rings. Based on the developed kinetic mechanism, the following collections were created:

 Dancing Doll Collection
 Marry-Go-Round Ring
 Ballerina & the Steadfast Tin Soldier Collection
 Waltz of The Flowers Collection
 Four Seasons Collection

The brand also offers a 12-pieces limited edition collections:

 Fairies Earrings
 Briar Rose Collection
 Prima Ballerina Collection
 Curiosities Collection

Notable patrons 
Sybarite Jewellery has notable patrons, including significant figures such as Rihanna and Elena Perminova.

Awards 

 2021 - Fairies Kinetic Earrings - Gold A’Design Award in Jewellery, Eye-wear, and Watch Design Category by the International Design Academy.
 2021 - Dancing Ballerina Kinetic Cocktail Ring - Silver A’Design Award in Jewellery, Eye-wear, and Watch Design Category by the International Design Academy.
 2022 - Safety Pin Ring - Gold A’Design Award in Jewellery, Eye-wear, and Watch Design Category by the International Design Academy.

Jury Memberships 
 2021 - Margarita Prykhodko was invited to take part in the inaugural jury of the Jewellery Masterpiece Awards, hosted by Tatyana Pfaifer.
 2022 - Margarita Prykhodko was invited to take part in the inaugural jury of the Jewellery Masterpiece Awards

References 

Jewellery companies